Giovanni Molin (25 April 1705 – 14 March 1773) was an Italian Roman Catholic cardinal.

Giovanni was born in Venice to a patrician family. He studied both civil and canon law at the University of Padua, and in 1728 he became a Franciscan priest. In 1755, he was appointed as bishop of Brescia, where he became a patron of the Biblioteca Queriniana. On 23 November 1761 he was elevated to Cardinal by pope Clement XIII. This placed him in conflict with the Venetian senate who had imposed some controls over monastic orders. These controls were in conflict with contents in the latest papal bull of In Coena Domini. Molin in 1769 was able to move to Rome. He became titular priest for the church of San Sisto in 1769. He is buried in the Cathedral of Brescia.

References

1705 births
1773 deaths
Cardinals (Catholic Church)
Clergy from Venice